Gordon Henderson may refer to:
 Gordon F. Henderson(1912–1993), Canadian intellectual property lawyer
 Gordon Henderson (politician) (born 1948), British Conservative Member of Parliament for Sittingbourne and Sheppey
 Gordon Henderson (band director) (born 1953), director of the UCLA Bruin Marching Band
 Gordon Henderson (musician), leader and founder of the musical group Exile One